Octomeria octomeriantha is a species of orchid endemic to Brazil (São Paulo to Paraná).

References

External links 

octomeriantha
Endemic orchids of Brazil
Orchids of São Paulo (state)
Orchids of Paraná (state)
Plants described in 1936